The Allahdad was an 1839 pogrom perpetrated by Muslims against the Mashhadi Jewish community in the city of Mashhad, Qajar Iran. It was characterized by the mass-killing and forced conversion of the Jews in the area to Islam. Following this event, many of the Mashhadi Jews began to actively practice crypto-Judaism while superficially adhering to Islamic beliefs. The Allahdad incident was a prominent event in the ambivalent history of Jewish–Muslim relations due to the fact that an entire community of Jews were forced to convert, and it was one of the first times European Jewry intervened on behalf of Iranian Jews.

The event was first described in Joseph Wolff's 1845 travelogue "Narrative of a mission to Bokhara", in which he wrote:
On Monday, the 11th of March, I arrived at Askerea, two miles distant from Meshed. I had sent on before the King's mehmoondar, and the gholam of the British embassy. The first who came to meet me was Mullah Mehdee (Meshiakh), the Jew with whom I had lodged twelve years ago, and who treated me most hospitably when in distress and misery and poverty, previous to the arrival of Abbas Mirza at Meshed, from Nishapoor.

All the Jews of Meshed, a hundred and fifty families, were compelled seven years ago, to turn Mussulmans. The occasion was as follows: A poor woman had a sore hand; a Mussulman physician advised her to kill a dog and put her hand in the blood of it; she did so; when suddenly the whole population rose, and said that they had done it in derision of their Prophet. Thirty-five Jews were killed in a few minutes; the rest, struck with terror, became Muhammedans ; and fanatic and covetous Muhammedans shouted, "Light of Muhammed has fallen upon them!" They are now more zealous Jews in secret than ever; but call themselves, like the Jews in Spain, Anusim, "the compelled ones!" Their children cannot suppress their feelings when their parents call them by their Muhammedan names! But Mullah Mehdee and Mullah Moshe believe in Christ, and Mullah Mehdee asked me to baptize him. He has been of the greatest use to the English in Heraut and Candahar, as his testimonials from Rawlinson and others amply testify.

In another narrative of the same event this incident happened during the Shia holy month on Muharram. The Shias were marching in the streets in memory of Hussein ibn Ali when the Jewish woman was throwing away the dog she killed for medical reasons. She was accused of deliberately offending the shi'is.

Still another narrative reports that the dog was only a pretext and the conflict was because of earlier confrontations between a Sayyid (descendant of Muhammad) and the Jews who did not want to pay him for the Husainia he built near the Jewish commercial shops.

In any case the recommendation by a Muslim physician seems unlikely as both Islamic and Jewish laws would consider dog's blood to be impure.

Mashhad's ruler had ordered his men to enter Jewish homes and mobs attacked the Jewish community, burning down the synagogue, looting homes, abducting girls, and killing between 30 and 40 people. With knives held to their throats, the Jewish patriarchs were forced to vocally proclaim their "allegiance" to Islam as it was agreed upon by the leaders of the community that in order to save the remaining 2,400 Jews, everyone must convert. Most converted and stayed in Mashhad, taking on Muslim names, while some left for other Iranian Jewish communities and to Afghanistan. That day became known as the Allahdad ("God’s Justice").

This event might also be understood in larger Jewish-Persian relations. Many Jews of Mashhad, including the chief of the local Jewish community, Mullah Mahdi Aqajan, served as agents of the British government. This fact in addition to recent withdrawal of Iran from Herat in 1838 under diplomatic pressure from the British government, created an increasingly hostile atmosphere towards the Jews in Mashhad. Few years after the incident with the intervention of Moses Montefiore the head of British Jewry at the time, Jews were allowed by Muhammad Shah's decree to return to Judaism. However most Jews fearing the anger of the local population decided to live outwardly as Muslims and living as crypto-Jews.
On the outside, they acted as Muslims: their clothes, names, and lifestyles resembled those of their Iranian neighbors. At home, however, they secretly taught their children to read Hebrew, lit candles, and observed Shabbat.
Some Mashhadi Jews did not feel safe in Mashhad anymore and decided to move to other cities in the area such as Bukhara and Samarqand. A large group moved to Herat in present-day Afghanistan, where the majority of the Muslims were Sunni and more tolerant of the Jews than the Shiites. 

A group of Persian Jewish refugees from Mashhad, escaping persecution back home in Qajar Persia, were granted rights to settle in the Sikh Empire around the year 1839. Most of the Jewish families settled in Rawalpindi (specifically in the Babu Mohallah neighbourhood) and Peshawar. Most of these Jews would leave for India during the partition of 1947.

Nearly a century passed before Mashad's Jews started practicing their faith openly with the coming of the more liberal Pahlavi dynasty (1925–1979). After World War II, most of them settled in Tehran, Israel, or New York City, with 4,000 moving to the United States, where many ran successful jewelry and carpet businesses. The commercial district in Great Neck, New York, has been reshaped to serve the needs of Mashhadis and other Iranian Jews. Many businesses there cater to Iranian customs and taste.

Worldwide there are 20,000 Mashhadis, of which about 10,000 live in Israel. Of the Mashhadis in the United States, many of them live in Great Neck, New York.

See also
 Antisemitism in Islam
 1910 Shiraz blood libel
 Anusim
 Chala
 Converso
 Dönmeh
 History of the Jews in Iran
 History of the Jews under Muslim rule
 Islamic–Jewish relations
 Marrano
 Neofiti
 Religious antisemitism
 Xuetes
 Yu Aw Synagogue

References

Further reading

Mehrdad Amanat, Jewish Identities in Iran: Resistance and Conversion to Islam and the Baha'i Faith, (I.B. Tauris, 2011), pp. 47ff.  Excerpts available  at Google Books.
Hilda Nissimi, The Crypto-Jewish Mashhadis: the shaping of religious and communal identity in their journey from Iran to New York (Sussex Academic Press, 2007),   Excerpts available at Google Books.
Albert Kaganovich, The Mashhadi Jews (Djedids) in Central Asia (Klaus Schwarz Verlag, 2007),  

Conversion to Islam
Crypto-Judaism
Islam and antisemitism
Antisemitism in Iran
Jewish Persian and Iranian history
Anti-Jewish pogroms by Muslims
Converts to Islam from Judaism
1839 in Judaism
Qajar Iran
1830s in Iran